Walterus Nyng (fl. 1304/5), was an English Member of Parliament.

He was a Member (MP) of the Parliament of England for Lewes in 1304/5.

References

13th-century births
14th-century deaths
English MPs 1305
People from Lewes